Andrew Davies (born 7 November 1976) is a Welsh cricketer. He is a left-handed batsman and a right-arm medium-pace bowler.

Davies was born in Neath and attended Dwyr-Y-Felin high school from 1988 to 1993. Andrew joined Christ College Brecon from 1993 to 1995 and boarded at School House Red. Davies played first team football, rugby and rugby sevens playing in the championship winning 7's team of 1994/95 under coach Jon Williams. Andrew captained the cricket team coached by Colin Kleiser.

Davies made his Championship debut in 1995, and, despite having an early career full of injury, he continued to play through limited overs cricket. In the 2001 Norwich Union League, he became Glamorgan's leading wicket taker, with 21 wickets at a 14.33 average.

Davies resides in South Wales with his family.

References

External links
Andrew Davies at ECB

1976 births
Living people
Welsh cricketers
Glamorgan cricketers
Wales National County cricketers